"Home Away from Homer" is the twentieth episode of the sixteenth season of the American animated television series The Simpsons. It originally aired on the Fox network in the United States on May 15, 2005.

Plot
Lisa calls in to an unpopular public radio station and wins tickets for four to an Albanian movie called Kosovo Autumn. Homer leaves Maggie with Ned Flanders, who agrees to babysit free of charge, while the rest of the family watches the movie. When Marge picks up Maggie and hastily offers to pay Ned admits to needing extra money as a giant retail store called Left-Mart is threatening his business. Marge suggests he rent out one of his rooms to someone. He agrees, giving the room to Katja and Vicky, two female community college students.

Taking advantage of his trusting nature, the two use their room as a staging area for a softcore pornographic website, sexyslumberparty.com. Bart and Milhouse come across a banner ad for the site and share their discovery with Homer, who proceeds to spread the news around town. Marge soon discovers Homer and Bart viewing the website and forces Homer to tell Ned everything. Ned angrily forces the girls to leave, but realizes that everyone has arrived to cheer for them. Horrified at both the town's mockery and Homer's betrayal, Ned leaves town, moving to "Humbleton, Pennsylvania", home of the porcelain "Humble figurines", which he collects. Angered by Homer's actions, Marge and Lisa tell him to be on his best behavior for their new neighbor, "Coach" Clay Roberts, who becomes a cynical bully towards Homer and litters the Simpsons' yard with Ned's fallen trees, cutting their cable, and siphoning gas from Homer's car.

Meanwhile, Ned finds the friendly pseudo-Germanic town of Humbleton to be everything he ever dreamed. However, when applying for a job at the Humbleton Figurine Workshop, the manager requests him to shave his moustache, declaring it "hippie-ish" and distracting. Ned briefly considers it, but soon decides it is more important than the opinions of the townspeople, who shun him.

Homer drives to Humbleton and pleads with Ned to return, who, upon seeing the judgmental faces of the Humbleton residents glaring at him, agrees. Clay refuses to leave the house, despite Ned pointing out that his $200,000 check bounced, thus he legally still owns the property, but is persuaded once Ned and Homer overpower him by sheer force. A few hours later, Homer obtains a pipe organ, which Ned believes is from the local church, and places it in Ned's backyard for a welcome-home party, which several Springfield residents attend. Ned is happy at the party, which soon irritates Homer.

Cultural references
 Clay works out to the song "(You Gotta) Fight for Your Right (to Party)" by the Beastie Boys.
 Clay is a parody of Biff Tannen from the Back to the Future film series.
 The song in the background when Flanders drives into Humbleton is "Lara's Theme" from the 1965 film Doctor Zhivago, a popular tune in music boxes.
 Flanders' first days in Humbleton are accompanied by the song "Bad Company" by Bad Company.
 Flanders bursts into the ornament factory with a scarf covering his mustache in the same manner as Mick Travis in the film if.... (1968).
 Flanders stands over a grate, causing his mustache to billow up in the wind like Marilyn Monroe's dress in the famous subway grate scene in The Seven Year Itch.
 Ned Flanders listens to Pat Boone's version of "Tutti Frutti".
 Katya tells Flanders that he rhymes like "Snoopy Dogg".
 Homer mocks comedian Jimmy Fallon when Bart and Milhouse are laughing at the pornographic website, claiming that if they say they are laughing at Fallon, he will know they are lying to him.
 The tune played at the garden party at the end is the 1981 song "Freeze Frame" by The J. Geils Band. This song would later be used on season 18's "Homerazzi" when Marge restages all the family photos.
 Lisa listens to a parody of National Public Radio, specifically the show "All Things Considered" and its opening tune. 
 One of the suggestions that Homer gives as a babysitter for Maggie is "Ghostface" from Scream.
 The other babysitter Homer suggested was "Grandma Shark Week".
 "Humble figurines" are a parody of Hummel figurines.

References

External links

SexySlumberParty.com, a website designed by the Fox network specifically for this episode

The Simpsons (season 16) episodes
2005 American television episodes
Kosovo in fiction